Edmond 10 (TC: 10號) is a Cantopop album by Edmond Leung, his first released by EMI.

Track listing
Zero VS Zero (零比零)
One Hour Photo (一小時沖印)
Love at Second Sight (二見鍾情)
Three Houses for Life (三宅一生)
Four-Man Band (披頭四)
501
666
Seven Friends (七友)
Eight (八)
Nine Nine Nine (九九九)
Seven Friends (Acapella Version) [七友(群星版)]     [Released in 2nd edition]
Featuring Denise Ho, Miriam Yeung, Candy Lo, Andy Hui, William So, Eddie Ng

Music awards

References

Edmond Leung albums
2003 albums
Cantonese-language albums